Punks Not Dead is the first studio album by the Scottish punk rock band The Exploited, released in April 1981 on Secret Records. Working class and loyal to the first impulses of the 1970s punk movement, the album was a reaction to critics who believed the punk rock genre was dead, and went against popular trends such as new wave and post-punk. It contains the double A side singles "Army Life/Fuck the Mods" and the later follow up "I Believe in Anarchy". "Army Life" details the experiences of Wattie Buchan when he was a 17-year-old squaddie on a tour of duty in Belfast in the 1970s.

Punks Not Dead peaked at no 20 on the UK charts in May of that year, gave the band a national following in the United Kingdom and it was the top selling 1981 independent UK release.

Legacy
Supported by a tour with the Anti-Nowhere League, the album had underground success and is regarded as one of the definitive Oi! albums, and its popularity gave rise to a variety of punk rock bands including The Business. The Exploited's song "Punks Not Dead" has symbolic significance for the punk movement.

Track listing
Side one
 "Punks Not Dead" – 1:51
 "Mucky Pup" (Puncture cover) – 1:42
 "Cop Cars" – 1:52
 "Free Flight" – 3:35
 "Army Life" – 2:37
 "Blown to Bits" – 2:40
 "Sex & Violence" – 5:11
Side two
 "S.P.G." – 2:07
 "Royalty" – 2:07
 "Dole Q" – 1:51
 "Exploited Barmy Army" – 2:28
 "Ripper" – 2:03
 "Out of Control" – 2:52
 "Son of a Copper" – 2:39
 "I Believe in Anarchy" – 2:03

Captain Oi! re-release
The Captain Oi! re-release (2001) includes The Exploited's contribution to Oi! The Album compilation and the first four singles (minus "I Believe in Anarchy" from the "Exploited Barmy Army" single) and was mastered by Tim Turan.

"Daily News" (Oi! The Album version)
"I Still Believe in Anarchy" (Oi! The Album version)
"Army Life" (single version)
"Fuck the Mods" ("Army Life" single)
"Crashed Out" ("Army Life" single)
"Exploited Barmy Army" (single version)
"What You Gonna Do" ("Exploited Barmy Army" single)
"Dogs of War" ("Dogs of War" single)
"Blown to Bits (Live)" ("Dogs of War" single)
"Dead Cities" ("Dead Cities" single)
"Hitler's in the Charts Again" ("Dead Cities" single)
"Class War" ("Dead Cities" single)

All songs written by The Exploited except "Mucky Pup" (by Puncture).

Personnel
The Exploited
Wattie Buchan - vocals
Big John Duncan - guitar, backing vocals
Gary McCormack - bass guitar, backing vocals
Glen "Dru Stix" Campbell - drums
with:
Carole & Navi - backing vocals
Produced by Dave Leaper and The Exploited
Mark Brennan and Karyn Dunning - liner notes
Brian Burrow - sleeve remix
Neil Ross - engineer
Mastered by Porky
Scott Billett - photography

References

Sources
Cogan, Brian, Encyclopedia of Punk Music and Culture, Westport, CN: Greenwood Press, 2006. pg 170–171. .
Credits
Tracks, Info and Credits
Reissue

1981 debut albums
The Exploited albums
Captain Oi! Records albums
Secret Records albums
Working-class culture in the United Kingdom